The 2019–20 South African Premier Division season (known as the ABSA Premiership for sponsorship reasons) was the 24th season of the Premier Soccer League since its establishment in 1996. The season began in August 2019 and concluded in September 2020. Mamelodi Sundowns were the two-time defending champions. This season's winner will qualify for the 2020–21 CAF Champions League along with the second-placed team. The 3rd placed team and Nedbank Cup winners qualify for the CAF Confederation Cup.

The season was postponed due to the COVID-19 pandemic. It resumed on 11 August 2020 after more than three months of suspension. Mamelodi Sundowns won the title in the last day of the competition, they beat Kaizer Chiefs who were leading for more than half of the season. Mamelodi Sundowns won their third consecutive title and their 10th title overall. This was the last season sponsored by ABSA.

Team changes

The following teams have changed division since the 2018–19 season.

To National First Division
Relegated from 2018–19 South African Premier Division
 Free State Stars

From National First Division
Promoted to 2019–20 South African Premier Division
 Stellenbosch

Teams

Stadium and locations

Number of teams by province

League table

Results

Position by round

Statistics

Top goal scorers

Hat-tricks

Top assists

Clean sheets

Discipline

Player
Most yellow cards: 11
 N.Makhubela(Lamontville Golden Arrows)

Most red cards: 1
16 players

Club
Most yellow cards: 72
AmaZulu

Most red cards: 3
Baroka
Chippa United

Monthly Awards

References

See also
2019 MTN 8
2019 Telkom Knockout
2019–20 Nedbank Cup
2019–20 National First Division

South Africa
Premier Division
Premier Soccer League seasons
South African Premier Division, 2019-20